The Lola B06/51, also known as the Lola FN06, is an open-wheel formula racing car, designed, developed and built by Lola for the Japanese Formula Nippon championship series, in 2006.

History

The car, manufactured by the British manufacturer Lola Racing Cars, was the only single-seater allowed in the Formula Nippon championship between 2006 and 2008. It replaced the previous Lola B03/51 chassis, which had been used between 2003 and 2005.

Its introduction also corresponded with the opening to the use of engines supplied by Honda and Toyota, replacing the monopoly of Mugen Motorsports. Since 2009 the Lola FN06 is replaced in the Formula Nippon by the FN09, built by the American Swift Engineering.

Technical specifications

It was powered by a naturally aspirated  Toyota RV8 or Mugen MF308 engine that produced around  @ 13,500 rpm. This places the FN06 on a level, compared to that of the cars used in championships in Europe, between the car of the GP2 Series and that of the Formula Renault 3.5 in the World Series by Renault.

References

Open wheel racing cars
Super Formula cars
Lola racing cars